Krystal Klear (Declan "Dec" Lennon) is a DJ and music producer from Ireland.  He lives in New York.  His debut record was Tried for Your Love.

Discography
 Neutron Dance
 Tried For Your Love - All City Records - (2010)
 Greensilver - Dub Organizer - (2010)
 Never Thought You Would Go (with Olivier Day Soul) - Eglo Records - (2011)
 More Attention - MadTech Records - (2012)
 We're Wrong - All City Records - (2012)
 Addiction - Rinse/Sony - (2013)
 Squad - Cold Tonic - (2014)
 Dance (7)FS - Cold Tonic - (2014)
 Ca$h Champagne (featuring Flex W) - Cold Tonic - (2014)
 Welcome To Pleasure (featuring Maurice Alexander and Tuff City Kids) - (2015)
 Squad Part II'''' - Cold Tonic - (2016)
 Danceteria / Keith Haring - Cold Tonic - (2017)
 Club Studies'' - Hot Haus Recs - (2018)

References

External links
 Krystal Klear: ‘The mental health issues in my industry are through the roof’

Irish DJs
Irish record producers
Living people
Year of birth missing (living people)